Polly Dome  is a prominent granite dome rising  above the northwest side of Tenaya Lake and Tioga Road in the Yosemite high country. The dome, more than 3 kilometers (~2 miles) long, is a substantially intact mass of granitic rock that has withstood heavy glaciation and exfoliation.  Forest clings to the less-steep parts of its north and west slopes. The southwest end of Polly Dome consists of the Stately Pleasure Dome,  lower than Polly Dome, but rising very steeply  from the shore of the lake. Polly Dome's summit has unobstructed views east to the Cathedral Range, north over Tuolumne Meadows to the Sierra crest, northwest over the Grand Canyon of the Tuolumne and southwest to Half Dome.

References

Granite domes of Yosemite National Park
Mountains of Mariposa County, California
Hills of California